Walter Erskine may refer to:

Walter Erskine, Earl of Mar and Kellie (1839–1888), Scottish peer
Walter Erskine, Earl of Mar and Kellie (1865–1955), Scottish nobleman